Pocket Full of Rocks (PFOR) is an American band formed in 1995.

The band operated independently for 10 years, releasing two albums: Songs to the King (2002) and To Make You Famous (2003). In 2005, they signed with Warner Bros. gospel music entity Word/Myrrh Records.

In 2006, the band was nominated for a Dove Award for New Artist of the Year at the 38th GMA Dove Awards. Their second album with Myrrh, Manifesto, was also nominated for a Dove Award at the 39th GMA Dove Awards.

Band members

 Michael Farren - keyboards, lead vocals, acoustic guitar
 Alisa Farren - vocals
 Ryan Riggins - electric guitar
 Jody Crump - bass
 David Rollins - drums

Discography

 Songs To The King (EP, 2002, independent)
 To Make You Famous (2003, independent)
 Song to the King (2006)
 Manifesto (2007)
 More Than Noise (2010)
 Let It Rain (2011)

References

External links
Official website
Discography on Jesus Freak Hideout

American Christian musical groups
Musical groups established in 1995